William Kempe was an actor.

William Kempe may also refer to:

William Kempe, 17th-century English actor and dancer, one of the original actors in Shakespeare's plays
William Kempe (burgess), see List of members of the Virginia House of Burgesses

See also
William Kemp (disambiguation)